&Me is a European romantic comedy film, written and directed by Norbert ter Hall based on a novel by Oscar van den Boogaard. It was produced by Phanta Vision Film International and released in 2009.

Cast 
 Mark Waschke as Eduard Schiller
 Verónica Echegui as Edurne Verona
 Teun Luijkx as Richard Merkelbach
 Rossy de Palma as Mama Verona
 Pamela Knaack as Getrud
 Howard Charles as Albert
 Rafael Cebrian as Julio

Background 
&Me  was shot across four countries in eight weeks, is told in five languages and employed an international cast and crew, claiming eight different nationalities. It takes place in the setting of the European Parliament moving every month from Brussels to Strasbourg in a convoy of enormous trucks.

The screenplay is based on the novel Fremdkörper by author Oscar van den Boogaard. His books are sold and translated in The Netherlands, Belgium, France, Germany, the UK, the US and Canada.

References

External links 

 Official website: andme-thefilm.com

2009 films
2009 romantic comedy films
Dutch romantic comedy films
Films based on Dutch novels
Films directed by Norbert ter Hall